, more commonly known by her stage name , is a Japanese singer, dancer and actress. Born in Tokyo, she started work as a singer from a young age. In 2007, Natsuki announced her engagement to percussionist Nobu Saitō, with their marriage taking place in Spring 2008.

Natsuki has participated in musical theatre, including that of Yukio Ninagawa. She provided the voice of Yubaba in Spirited Away, played the young witch's mother in the Japanese TV remake of Bewitched and has twice been nominated for a Japanese Academy Award. Natsuki played the character Big Mama in the Japanese version of Metal Gear Solid 4: Guns of the Patriots and has also acted in television dramas, such as the 2005 series Nobuta o Produce, playing the Vice Principal, Katharine.

Filmography

Film
 Otoko wa Tsurai yo series:
Tora-san, My Uncle (1989)
Tora-san Takes a Vacation (1990)
Tora-san Confesses (1991)
Tora-San Makes Excuses (1992)
Tora-san to the Rescue (1995)
Tora-san, Wish You Were Here (2019)
Onimasa (1982)
Legend of the Eight Samurai (1983)
Fireflies in the North (1984)
Jittemai (1986)
Death Powder (1986)
The Hunted (1995)
Samurai Fiction (1998)
Spirited Away (2001), Yubaba (voice)
Shōjo (2001)
Ping Pong (2002)
Okusama wa Majo (2004)
Sugar and Spice (2006)
Sakuran (2007)
Girl in the Sunny Place (2013)
Isle of Dogs (2018), Auntie (voice)
Ikiru Machi (2018)
Vision (2018)
Over the Sky (2020), Mori Obaa-chan (voice)
Angry Rice Wives (2021), Taki
Yudō (2023)
Sekai no Owari kara (2023)
See Hear Love (2023), Tae Izumimoto

Television
 G-Men '75 (1979–80)
 Yoshitsune (2005)
 Carnation (2011)
 Montage (2016)
 Meet Me After School (2018)
 Okaeri Mone (2021)

Video Games
 Metal Gear Solid 4: Guns of the Patriots (Big Mama) (2008)
 Uncharted 3: Drake's Deception (Katherine Marlowe) (2011)

Japanese dub

Live-action
 The Devil Wears Prada (2010 NTV edition) (Miranda Priestly (Meryl Streep))
 Feud (Joan Crawford (Jessica Lange))
 The West Wing (seasons 1–4) (C.J. Cregg (Allison Janney))

Animation
 Ballerina (Régine Le Haut)
 Moana (Tala)

References

External links 

Natsuki Mari Official homepage 
List of roles on allcinema.net 

Asadora lead actors
Living people
1952 births
Japanese female dancers
Singers from Tokyo
20th-century Japanese actresses
21st-century Japanese actresses
20th-century Japanese women singers
20th-century Japanese singers
21st-century Japanese women singers
21st-century Japanese singers